Roland Müller (born 13 January 1961, in Oranienburg) is a German former sport shooter who competed in the 1988 Summer Olympics.

References

1961 births
Living people
German male sport shooters
ISSF pistol shooters
Olympic shooters of East Germany
Shooters at the 1988 Summer Olympics
People from Oranienburg
Sportspeople from Brandenburg
20th-century German people
21st-century German people